Oratio obliqua (or indirect speech) is a topic in modern philosophy, considered to be a variety of the wider topic of metarepresentation. In recent years it has been made prominent by the works especially of the French philosopher François Recanati.

Bibliography
De Brabanter, Philippe (2010). "The Semantics and Pragmatics of Hybrid Quotations". Wiley Online Library.
De Brabanter, Philippe (2013). "François Recanati's radical pragmatic theory of quotation". Teorema: International Journal of Philosophy 32 (2):109-128. (Contains further bibliography.)
Künne, Wolfgang (2015). "Frege on That-Clauses" In: Weiss, Bernhard (ed.) Dummett on Analytical Philosophy, pp. 135–173.
Ludwig, Kirk. Review: François Recanati's "Oratio Obliqua, Oratio Recta: An Essay on Metarepresentation". Philosophy and Phenomenological Research, Vol. 66, No. 2 (Mar., 2003), pp. 481–488. (Also on JSTOR.)
Prior, A. N.; Kenny, A. (1963). "Oratio Obliqua". Aristotelian Society Supplementary Volume, Volume 37, Issue 1, 14 July 1963, pp. 115–146.
Recanati, François (2000). Oratio Obliqua, Oratio Recta: An Essay on Metarepresentation. MIT Press.
Recanati, François (2003). "Oratio Obliqua, Oratio Recta: An Essay on Metarepresentation". Philosophical Review 111(3), January 2003. (A summary of Recanati's book.)

References

Concepts in the philosophy of mind